Calpenia is a genus of tiger moths in the family Erebidae. The genus was erected by Frederic Moore in 1872.

Species
Calpenia monilifera Oberthür, 1903
Calpenia saundersi Moore, 1872

Taxonomy
Calpenia khasiana, Calpenia takamukui and Calpenia zerenaria have been reclassified to the genus Kishidaria.

References

External links

Callimorphina